Herstory in the Making is the debut studio album by American rapper Young M.A. It was released on September 27, 2019, by M.A Music and 3D. The album features guest appearances from Max YB and Relle Bey and features production from Zaytoven, Mike Zombie, Amadeus, and NY Bangers, among others. It was supported by seven singles: "PettyWap", "Car Confessions", "Bleed", "Stubborn Ass", "Big", "PettyWap 2", and "No Mercy".

Writing and recording 
The album is dedicated to M.A's late brother Kenneth Ramos, who was murdered on September 26, 2009. In a press release, Young M.A stated: 

The album was recorded with guest appearances from Max YB and Relle Bey and production from Zaytoven, Mike Zombie, Amadeus, and NY Bangers, among others. It follows Young M.A.'s Herstory EP, released in 2017.

Marketing and sales 
On August 29, 2019, Young M.A revealed the album's title, cover art, track listing and release date via her social media accounts. The album was released on September 27 by M.A Music and 3D. It peaked at number 16 on the Billboard 200 albums chart.

Critical reception 

Herstory in the Making was met with positive reviews. Pitchfork reviewer Sheldon Pearce hailed it as "another big, long flex from one of the most skilled rappers to emerge in the last five years". In his Substack-published "Consumer Guide" column, Robert Christgau said, "It's a woman's voice with a brawny, low-pitched masculinity to it, articulated with no show of care and every well-chosen word distinct. The hook-free beats are as utilitarian and accomplished as vocals that always take the rhymes where they want to go".

Track listing
Credits adapted from Tidal and Respect.

Charts

References

External links

2019 debut albums
Albums produced by Zaytoven
Albums produced by Frank Dukes
Albums in memory of deceased persons